The 1995 National Camogie League is a competition in the women's team field sport of camogie was won by Cork, who defeated Armagh in the final, played at St Finbarrs.

Arrangements
Armagh, who won the All-Ireland Junior title in 1993 and the Intermediate title in 1994, were competing for the first time and created the first of several major shocks when they defeated understrength title holders Galway by 3-8 to 0-13 at Middleton, with the help of a first half goals from Bernie McBride, a kicked goal from Patricia McEvoy as the game entered the last quarter and a late free from Ursula McGivern. Galway led by 0-9 to 1-4 at half time and Sharon Glynn was their only player to score, scoring all of but two of Galway’s points. Armagh then went on to defeat Wexford in the semi-final.

The Final
Two goals each from Colette O'Mahony and Lynn Dunlea gave Cork victory against surprise finalists Armagh. Cork led 3-7 to 0-2 at half time. Armagh had three goals in the second half but Cork remained in control.

Division 2
The Junior National League, known since 2006 as Division Two, was won by Galway intermediates who defeated Down in the final.

Final stages

References

External links
 Camogie Association

National Camogie League
1995